Phil Lane (12 March 1911 – 8 August 2006) was an Australian rules footballer who played for Fitzroy in the Victorian Football League (VFL).

Although he was listed at Fitzroy for three years, Lane made his only appearance with the seniors early in the 1932 VFL season, a 19-point loss to North Melbourne at Brunswick Street. He then became a field umpire and officiated in 26 VFL games from 1943 to 1946 as well as the reserves Grand Final in 1947.

References

Holmesby, Russell and Main, Jim (2007). The Encyclopedia of AFL Footballers. 7th ed. Melbourne: Bas Publishing.

1911 births
2006 deaths
Australian rules footballers from Melbourne
Fitzroy Football Club players
Australian Football League umpires
People from West Melbourne, Victoria